Jose Antonio Rosado (born November 9, 1974) is a former Major League Baseball pitcher who played for the Kansas City Royals from 1996 to 2000.

Playing career
He was drafted by the Royals in the 12th round of the 1994 amateur draft. He made his major league debut om June 12,1996 and came in 4th in Rookie of the year voting despite having only made 16 starts. He also gave up Paul Molitor's 3000th career hit on September 16, 1996. Rosado was the winning pitcher in the 1997 MLB All-Star Game despite giving up a home run to Javy López and would make another all star game in 1999. His career was effectively ended in early 2000 when it was revealed he had torn his rotator cuff and despite several attempts to rehab he would not play in the minors or major leagues again.

Coaching career
Rosado began coaching in 2011 in the New York Yankees minor league system. He is currently the pitching coach for the Yankees High-A affiliate the Tampa Tarpons. He was the pitching coach for Team Puerto Rico in the World Baseball Classic in both 2013 and 2017, helping the team to a second-place finish in both years.

References

External links

1974 births
Living people
Sportspeople from Jersey City, New Jersey
Galveston Whitecaps baseball players
Kansas City Royals players
Major League Baseball pitchers
American League All-Stars
Baseball players from Jersey City, New Jersey
Minor league baseball coaches
Gulf Coast Royals players
Wilmington Blue Rocks players
Omaha Royals players
Wichita Wranglers players
Indios de Mayagüez players